Campesterol is a phytosterol whose chemical structure is similar to that of cholesterol, and is one of the ingredients for E number E499.

Natural occurrences 
Many vegetables, fruits, nuts, and seeds contain campesterol, but in low concentrations. Banana, pomegranate, pepper, coffee, grapefruit, cucumber, onion, oat, potato, and lemon grass (citronella) are few examples of common sources containing campesterol at roughly 1–7 mg/100 g of the edible portion. In contrast, canola and corn oils contain as much as 16–100 mg/100 g.  Levels are variable and are influenced by geography and growing environment.  In addition, different strains have different levels of plant sterols.  A number of new genetic strains are currently being engineered with the goal of producing varieties high in campesterol and other plant sterols. It is also found in dandelion coffee.

It is so named because it was first isolated from the rapeseed (Brassica campestris). It is thought to have anti-inflammatory effects. It was demonstrated that it inhibits several pro-inflammatory and matrix degradation mediators typically involved in osteoarthritis-induced cartilage degradation.

Precursor of anabolic steroid boldenone 
Being a steroid, campesterol is a precursor of anabolic steroid boldenone. Boldenone undecylenate is commonly used in veterinary medicine to induce growth in cattle, but it is also one of the most commonly abused anabolic steroids in sports. This led to suspicion that some athletes testing positive on boldenone undecylenate did not actually abuse the hormone itself, but consumed food rich in campesterol or similar phytosteroids.

Cardiovascular disease
Plant sterols were first shown in the 1950s to be beneficial in lowering LDLs and cholesterol. Since then, numerous studies have also reported the beneficial effects of the dietary intake of phytosterols, including campesterol.

The campesterol molecules are thought to compete with cholesterol, thus reducing the absorption of cholesterol in the human intestine.  Plant sterols may also act directly on intestinal cells and affect transporter proteins. In addition, an effect on the synthesis of cholesterol-transporting proteins may occur in the liver cells through processes including cholesterol esterification and lipoprotein assembly, cholesterol synthesis, and apolipoprotein (apo) B100-containing lipoprotein removal.

Serum levels of campesterol and the ratio of campesterol to cholesterol have been proposed as measures of cardiac risk.  Some studies have suggested that higher levels predict lower cardiac risk.  However, extremely high levels are thought to be indicative of higher risk, as indicated by genetic disorders such as sitosterolemia. Study results of serum levels have been conflicting.  A recent meta-analysis suggests that no clear relationship exists, and that perhaps previous studies have been confounded by other factors.  For example, people who have a higher campesterol level related to a diet high in fruits and nuts may be consuming a Mediterranean-style diet, thus have lower risk because of other lipids or lifestyle factors.  Intestinal absorption of cholesterol varies between individuals due to variations in the genes that encode for two proteins. The NPC1L1 protein which sits on the luminal side of the enterocyte is responsible for sterol absorption. Its counterpart, the ABCG5/G8 ATP Binding Cassette protein which also sits on the luminal side of the enterocyte, and on the bile canaliculi side of the hepatocyte, is responsible for sterol efflux. Variations in each of these proteins causes variation in absorption and efflux of dietary and biliary sterols - both cholesterol and plant sterols.

Although studies in humans have shown that consumption of phytosterols may reduce LDL levels, evidence to recommend them as a treatment for hypercholesterolemia is insufficient. Larger trials are needed to provide such evidence, and are underway. Animal studies have shown that campesterol and other phytosterols can reduce the size of atherogenic plaques, but no data yet show that consumption of phytosterols results in any clinical benefit such as a reduction in atherosclerosis, heart disease, cardiac events, or mortality.

Adverse effects

Nutrient levels
Excessive supplementation with plant sterols may be associated with reductions in beta-carotene and lycopene levels. Excessive long-term consumption of plant sterols might have a deleterious effect on vitamin E.

Increased risk of disease

Excessive use of plant sterols has been associated with an increased risk of cardiovascular disease, and genetic conditions that cause extremely elevated levels of some phytosterols, such as sitosterol, are associated with higher risks of cardiovascular disease. However, this is an active area of debate, and no data suggest that modestly elevated levels of campesterol have a negative cardiac impact.

References

External links 
ARS GRIN
NutritionData

Phytosterols